Queen Mary's High School, situated on Upper Forster Street, just outside Walsall town centre, is an all-female selective-education and grammar school and entry in Year 7 is by passing an entrance exam. It is twinned with Queen Mary's Grammar School, and like the Grammar School is part of the Queen Mary's Foundation.

The main body of the school is girls only, but the Sixth Form is open to applicants of both sexes conditional on a minimum grade achievement at GCSE (no fewer than 7 GCSEs above 'B' Grade). This policy is similar to that of Queen Mary's Grammar School. However, there are a very small number of males who attend the school- no more than ten in a school of 1000.

The school gained an outstanding level in the Ofsted report when it was last inspected in 2007.

The school was a Language College and it is compulsory for pupils to take Mandarin, French, German, or Spanish from year seven to GCSE level; Japanese had until recently also been an option. In Year 8, pupils begin studying an additional language. Pupils visit Spain, France or Germany in Year 8, according to which of these languages they are studying. The school also sponsors exchanges with schools in Germany and Japan. Pupils can also take Latin or Greek every three years as an extra-curricular activity, culminating in an additional GCSE. 

Class sizes in the lower school are currently around 24 girls, with Design Technology classes being in groups of 16. However, Year 7 of the 13/14 academic year, and all subsequent years, have class sizes of around 30, as the school has increased the number of students it can take. Sixth-form classes have a minimum of about 8 students and a maximum of 20.

The school is divided into houses named after famous 19th-century female authors - Austen (after Jane Austen), Bronte (after Emily Brontë), Eliot (after George Eliot) and Shelley (after Mary Shelley), the latter being a new house in the 2012/13 academic year. Each house has a member of staff in charge of it, a captain from Year 13 (upper sixth form) and a vice-captain from Year 12 (lower sixth form).

Alumni of the school include Meera Syal.

Notable staff
 Barbara Foxley was head here

References

External links
 School website
 Internal Home Page
 history of the school

Educational institutions established in 1893
Academies in Walsall
Grammar schools in Walsall
Girls' schools in the West Midlands (county)
1893 establishments in England